Walpurgis is the sixth studio album released by Aimer. It was released on April 14, 2021 in a regular CD only edition and in three versions: a limited CD + BD edition (Type-A), a limited CD + DVD edition (Type-B), and a Limited Edition CD + 3 BD edition. In addition, Walpurgis is Aimer's first album to be available in LP format.

Walpurgis peaked at No. 2 on Oricon's Weekly Album Chart dated April 26, 2021 and hit No. 1 on Billboard Japans Hot Albums and Top Albums Sales Charts dated April 21, 2021.

Track listing

Charts

References

External links
  (Japanese)
 
 Walpurgis / Aimer  on VGMdb

Aimer albums
2021 albums
Japanese-language albums
SME Records albums